KCHU (770 AM) is a non-commercial radio station in Valdez, Alaska, United States. Through its main transmitter, two full-service FM stations, and two translators,
the station covers an area the size of the state of Ohio, but with a population just over 10,000.

Overview
KCHU airs a range of public radio programming from the National Public Radio and Public Radio International networks, including Morning Edition, All Things Considered, The World, Democracy Now, Fresh Air, American Routes, Beale Street, and World Cafe.  It also broadcasts local and state news and public affairs programs, as well as music programs hosted by community volunteers.

KCHU is repeated on KXKM 89.7 FM in McCarthy and KXGA 90.5 FM in Glennallen. It is also relayed by four low-power translators to widen its broadcasting area.

Original KCHU, 1975-77
The KCHU callsign was assigned earlier to a community radio station licensed to Dallas, Texas in the mid-late 1970s. The station was started by Dennis Gross and Lorenzo Milam, who had previously worked together at a pioneer community station, KDNA, in St. Louis. KCHU signed on at 90.9 FM on September 1, 1975, broadcasting an eclectic mix of music and public affairs programs. Beleaguered by debt and political infighting, the station signed off exactly two years later.

KCHU Television
The KCHU call letters were originally used on a television station licensed to San Bernardino, in Southern California, which operated on channel 18 from March 6, 1962, until June 25, 1964.

Stations
In addition to its main frequency, KCHU broadcasts on the following repeater and translator stations:

Full-power repeater stations

Translator stations

See also
List of community radio stations in the United States

References

External links
KCHU official website

CHU
NPR member stations
Community radio stations in the United States
CHU
Radio stations established in 1975